In condensed matter physics, the dynamic structure factor (or dynamical structure factor) is a mathematical function that contains information about inter-particle correlations and their time evolution. It is a generalization of the structure factor that considers correlations in both space and time. Experimentally, it can be accessed most directly by inelastic neutron scattering or X-ray Raman scattering.

The dynamic structure factor is most often denoted , where  (sometimes ) is a wave vector (or wave number for isotropic materials), and  a frequency (sometimes stated as energy). It is defined as:
 

Here , is called the intermediate scattering function and can be measured by neutron spin echo spectroscopy. The intermediate scattering function is the spatial Fourier transform of the van Hove function :

Thus we see that the dynamical structure factor is the spatial and temporal  Fourier transform of van Hove's time-dependent pair correlation function. It can be shown (see below), that the intermediate scattering function is the correlation function of the Fourier components of the density : 

The dynamic structure is exactly what is probed in coherent inelastic neutron scattering. The differential cross section is : 

where  is the scattering length.

The van Hove function
The van Hove function for a spatially uniform system containing  point particles is defined as:

It can be rewritten as:

References

Further reading 

Lovesey, Stephen W. (1986). Theory of Neutron Scattering from Condensed Matter - Volume I: Nuclear Scattering. Oxford University Press. .

Condensed matter physics
Neutron scattering